Nicolas Hazard is a French entrepreneur and the founder and CEO of INCO.

Biography

Education 
Nicolas Hazard graduated from HEC Paris and earned a Master in Public Affairs degree from Sciences-Po Paris.

Entrepreneur 
Nicolas Hazard advocates for the development of a new economy that is environmentally sustainable and socially responsible.  In 2010, he created INCO, a global organization present in 50 countries. The organization supports companies shaping this new economy through its investment activities (INCO Ventures) and incubation programs (INCO Incubation). With INCO Academy, the organization trains and supports employment for all those who wish to work in this new economy.

In 2016, Nicolas Hazard created Impact², known as the "Davos" of social entrepreneurship, which is now held every year at the City Hall in Paris and hosts more than 1,500 economic and political leaders, from 50 countries.

In addition, Nicolas Hazard is committed to those who wish to make positive change within their local communities. He has developed and launched a network of co-working and incubator spaces to allow solutions from rural areas to scale-up for global impact. In 2020, the first « Residence » was launched in Saint-Bertrand-de-Comminges.

Special advisor 
Since July 2020, Nicolas Hazard has been special adviser in charge of the social and solidarity economy at the European Commission, reporting to President Ursula Van der Leyen and Commissioner for Employment and Social Rights Nicolas Schmit.

Hazard has worked with various political figures, including Anne Hidalgo. He was President of the Strategic Council of the City of Paris.  This institution gathers different personalities from civic society and major economic stakeholders in order to shape the future of the city and to promote it internationally.

In 2018, he worked with Professor Muhammad Yunus to implement a social business program. He advised Benoît Hamon on entrepreneurship for his 2017 presidential campaign, and launched the first training program for drone pilots alongside Valérie Pécresse in partnership with the Île-de-France region. He has also worked alongside Alain Juppé, Romano Prodi and Hillary Clinton.

Awards 
 Young Global Leader in 2015 by the World Economic Forum
 Young Global Leader by the French American Foundation in 2016 
 Young Global Leader by the Franco British Foundation in 2017
 2017 SXSW Community Service Awards Honorees

Publications 
 Capitalism for all, 20 enterprises that change the world, Edit the World, 2013
 L'entreprise du XXIe siècle sera sociale ou ne sera pas, Rue de l'échiquier Editions, 2012
 La Ruée des Licornes, Lemieux Editions, 2017
Appel à la guérilla mondiale, Débats Publics Editions, 2019
Le bonheur est dans le village : 30 solutions qui viennent de nos campagnes, Flammarion Editions, 2021
Nicolas Hazard regularly contributes to the daily French newspaper Le Monde, as well as the Guardian and the Stanford Social Innovation Review.

Notes and references

External links 
 INCO's official website
 CALSO's official website

21st-century French businesspeople
1982 births
Living people